Haranggaol is a subdistrict in Simalungun, North Sumatra, Indonesia.

References

Populated places in North Sumatra